Elections to West Wiltshire District Council were held on 3 May 2007.  The whole council was up for election and the Conservatives took control.

Most wards had boundary changes or were new. One ward, Shearwater, was uncontested.

Of the 44 new members, 21 were not members of the outgoing council.

The district councillors were elected on 3 May 2007 for a four-year term of office, but a review of local government determined in 2008 that the four district councils of Wiltshire should be merged with Wiltshire County Council to form a new unitary authority for Wiltshire with effect from 1 April 2009, when the district councillors' term of office would end. The county council was treated as a "continuing authority", and elections to the new Wiltshire Council unitary council took place in June 2009.

Results

|}

Ward results

Atworth, Whitley and South Wraxall

Avonside

Bradford-on-Avon North

Bradford-on-Avon South

Dilton

Ethandune

Manor Vale

Melksham East

Melksham Spa

Melksham Without

Mid Wylye Valley

Shearwater

Summerham

Trowbridge and North Bradley

Trowbridge and Southwick

Trowbridge Central

Trowbridge East

Trowbridge North East

Trowbridge North West

Trowbridge South West

Warminster East

Warminster West

Westbury Ham

Westbury Laverton

See also
West Wiltshire local elections

References

External links
West Wiltshire District Council election results - 3 May 2007 at wiltshire.gov.uk (ward by ward)
2007 West Wiltshire election result at bbc.co.uk (general result)

2007
2007 English local elections
2000s in Wiltshire